"Story" (stylized in all caps) is a song by Japanese singer-songwriter Rina Aiuchi. It was released on 22 July 2009 through Giza Studio, as a double A-side with "Summer Light" and the lead single from her second compilation album All Singles Best: Thanx 10th Anniversary. The single was released in three editions: one standard edition and two limited editions. Following the release, the single peaked at number nine in Japan and has sold over 8,413 copies nationwide. The song served as the theme song to the Japanese television show All Japan High School Quiz Championship.

Track listing

Charts

Certification and sales

|-
! scope="row"| Japan (RIAJ)
| 
| 8,413 
|-
|}

Release history

References

2009 singles
2009 songs
J-pop songs
Song recordings produced by Daiko Nagato
Songs written by Rina Aiuchi